Waltz Across Texas is a 1982 American drama film directed by Ernest Day and starring Anne Archer and Terry Jastrow, who were married.

Plot
A headstrong young oilman and a beautiful geologist clash wills on the trail of Texas crude.  The first meeting between John Taylor— a down-home, intuitive Texan whose expertise lies in guessing where petroleum is located — and feisty Gail Weston— who, as a geologist, is not in the habit of guessing — is hardly promising.  So when their first drilling site turns up dry, Gail packs up and heads north, but the lure of oil discovery is strong and soon she finds herself in partnership with John on their own wildcat well.  Amid the breathtaking beauty of Midland, Texas, they share a unique quest...and a tender love affair.

Cast
Anne Archer as Gail Weston
Terry Jastrow as John Taylor
Richard Farnsworth as Frank Walker
Noah Beery Jr. as Joe Locker
Mary Kay Place as Kit Peabody
Josh Taylor as Like Jarvis
Ben Piazza as Bll Wrather

Reception
Leonard Maltin gave the film two and a half stars.

References

External links
 
 

1982 films
American drama films
Films scored by Steve Dorff
Films set in Texas
1982 drama films
1980s English-language films
1980s American films